Georgi Manchev (born ) is a Bulgarian male volleyball player. He is part of the Bulgaria men's national volleyball team. On club level he played for VC CSKA Sofia.

References

External links
 profile at FIVB.org

1990 births
Living people
Bulgarian men's volleyball players
Place of birth missing (living people)